Hummanaya Blowhole is the only known blowhole in Sri Lanka and it is considered to be the second largest blowhole in the world.  (Sinhala:  = ) refers to the noise, "hoo", that can be heard a distance away when the blowhole is active.

Location

Attraction
Hummanaya is a natural blowhole, and caused when sea water rushes through a submerged cavern and is pushed upwards. The sea water flows underneath the shore, and then comes out of this hole due to pressure.

This site has now been developed as a tourist attraction, with a small visitors' information centre on marine life and a viewing platform.

References

Blowholes
Tangalle